Alexander Rea (17 October 1858 —  4 February 1924) was a British archaeologist who worked mainly in South British India. He is known for unearthing a sarcophagus from the hillocks of Pallavaram in Tamil Nadu.

Early life
Rea was born in Dundee and educated at Glasgow. He is a F.S.A (Scot). He reached British India in 1882 and joined the Archaeological survey of Southern India.

Career

First Assistant. Archaeological Survey of South India in 1882. He worked as acting lecturer on Art and Geometry in the School of Arts. Madras, between 1884 to 1888. He was Professional Adviser to Government on the conservation of ancient monuments; Member for Archaeology on the Sub-Committee on the Public Services Commission in 1887. Rea was deputed to examine and report on certain Pre-historic burial places in Madras, Chingleput, and Kodaikanal in July 1887. Rea worked as assistant editor, "Epigraphia Indica" and Record of the Archaeological Survey of India in 1888. He took charge as In charge of the Office of the Archaeological Survey of Western India from 9 July to 8 October 1889. Archaeological Surveyor in 1890; Superintendent, Archaeological Survey, Madras, 1891. Rea was deputed to examine and report on the ancient remains in Coorg in 1893; Alexander Rea became the first Superintendent of Archaeological Survey of Southern India in 1902. Honorary Assistant Superintendent, Central Museum, Madras, 1903; He retired in 1913 as Superintendent, Archaeological Survey of Southern India. His body was buried in Wesleyan Church, Bangalore on 5 February 1924.

Publications
Some of his selected publications are as follows

A description of the ruins of "Vijayanagar" in the Madras Christian College Magazine, 1886; 
"Some Pre-historic Burial Places in Southern India" in the Journal of the Asiatic Society of Bengal, 1888; 
"Method of Archaeological preservation in India" in the Journal of the Royal Asiatic Society of Great Britain and Ireland, 1890;
"Pallava Architecture"

References

British archaeologists
1924 deaths
1858 births